This is a list of the Australian moth species of the family Lacturidae. It also acts as an index to the species articles and forms part of the full List of moths of Australia.

Aictis erythrozona Turner, 1926
Anticrates metreta (Turner, 1903)
Anticrates paraxantha (Meyrick, 1907)
Anticrates phaedima Turner, 1913
Anticrates zapyra Meyrick, 1907
Burlacena aegerioides Walker, 1865
Eustixis aglaodora (Turner, 1942)
Eustixis calliphylla (Turner, 1903)
Eustixis caminaea (Meyrick, 1887)
Eustixis cristata 
Eustixis dives (Walker, 1854)
Eustixis erythocera (Walker, 1866)
Eustixis erythractis (Meyrick, 1887)
Eustixis haplochroa (Turner, 1932)
Eustixis laetifera (Walker, [1865])
Eustixis leucophthalma (Meyrick, 1907)
Eustixis mactata (R. Felder & Rogenhofer, 1875)
Eustixis panopsia (Turner, 1926)
Eustixis parallela (Meyrick, 1889)
Eustixis phoenobapta (Turner, 1903)
Eustixis pilcheri (T.P. Lucas, 1891)
Eustixis pteropoecila (Turner, 1913)
Eustixis rhodomochla (Turner, 1942)
Eustixis rubritexta (Meyrick, 1913)
Eustixis sapotearum (Swainson, 1851)
Eustixis thiospila 
Thyridectis psephonoma Meyrick, 1887
Trychnomera anthemis Turner, 1913

External links 
Lacturidae at Australian Insects

Australia